Vietnamophryne occidentalis is a species of microhylid frog endemic to northern Thailand. Its type locality is Doi Tung Mountain, Chiang Rai Province, northern Thailand.

References

Vietnamophryne
Amphibians of Thailand
Amphibians described in 2018